Dorothy Arnold (born  Dorothy Arnoldine Olson; November 21, 1917 – November 13, 1984) was an American film actress and the first wife of baseball star Joe DiMaggio. Her 20-year movie career began with 1937's Freshies and ended with 1957's Lizzie.

Early life
She was born as Dorothy Arnoldine Olson in Duluth, Minnesota, of Norwegian heritage. By the age of 12 she was performing on amateur nights at Duluth's Lyric Theater and with the local Salvation Army Band. She graduated from Denfeld High School in 1935. Her first theatrical job was with the Band Box Revue, traveling out of Chicago. She studied at Paramount School in New York and played bits in pictures as a dancer.

Career
Arnold tested twice with Paramount Pictures, but it was Universal Studios that offered her a stock contract. She appeared in 15 films between 1937 and 1939. Her most memorable roles were as the imperiled heroine Jean Drew in The Phantom Creeps (with Bela Lugosi and Robert Kent) and Gloria DeVere in The House of Fear (with Irene Hervey and William Gargan).

Following her marriage to DiMaggio, she quit acting. A brief comeback in 1957 included her last film, MGM's Lizzie (with Eleanor Parker and Joan Blondell) and appearances on TV's The Adventures of Jim Bowie and Dragnet.

Personal life
Arnold met DiMaggio in 1937 – she was 19, he was 23 – on the set of the film Manhattan Merry-Go-Round (released in 1937). DiMaggio had a minor speaking role in the film; Arnold had no lines. The couple married on November 18, 1939 at Sts. Peter and Paul Church in San Francisco. 

On October 23, 1941, the year of DiMaggio's famous 56-game hitting streak, Arnold gave birth to their only child, Joseph. The couple split up in 1942 but later reconciled in front of the press. They separated again on October 6, 1943. DiMaggio enlisted in the U.S. Army and was sent to Hawaii. Arnold filed for divorce, which was granted on May 12, 1944. She received $500 a month in alimony, custody of Joe Jr., and $150 in child support. Despite the divorce, they spent Christmas together in 1945. 

Her second marriage was to stockbroker George Schuster in 1946. They divorced in 1950.
Arnold's third marriage, on August 27, 1970, was to Ralph D. Peck ( Peckovich), to whom she remained married until her death on November 13, 1984.

Later years and death
Arnold and her third husband lived in Cathedral City, California where they owned and operated a supper club called Charcoal Charley's, just outside Palm Springs. She performed at the club until her death from pancreatic cancer in 1984. 

Arnold's November 17, 1984, obituary in The Desert Sun newspaper stated Dorothy Arnold Peck had passed away at the La Gloria Clinic in Ensenada, Mexico.

Filmography

Film

Television

References

External links
 
 

1917 births
1984 deaths
Actresses from Duluth, Minnesota
People from Cathedral City, California
American film actresses
American people of Norwegian descent
American television actresses
Deaths from cancer in Mexico
Deaths from pancreatic cancer
20th-century American actresses